In seismology, strong ground motion is the strong earthquake shaking that occurs close to (less than about 50 km from) a causative fault.  The strength of the shaking involved in strong ground motion usually overwhelms a seismometer, forcing the use of accelerographs (or strong ground motion accelerometers) for recording. The science of strong ground motion also deals with the variations of fault rupture, both in total displacement, energy released, and rupture velocity.

As seismic instruments (and accelerometers in particular) become more common, it becomes necessary to correlate expected damage with instrument-readings.  The old Modified Mercalli intensity scale (MM), a relic of the pre-instrument days, remains useful in the sense that each intensity-level provides an observable difference in seismic damage.

After many years of trying every possible manipulation of accelerometer-time histories, it turns out that the extremely simple peak ground velocity (PGV) provides the best correlation with damage. PGV merely expresses the peak of the first integration of the acceleration record. Accepted formulae now link PGV with MM Intensity.  Note that the effect of soft soils gets built into the process, since one can expect that these foundation conditions will amplify the PGV significantly.

"ShakeMaps" are produced by the United States Geological Survey, provide almost-real-time information about significant earthquake events, and can assist disaster-relief teams and other agencies.

Correlation with the Mercalli scale

The United States Geological Survey created the Instrumental Intensity scale, which maps peak ground velocity on an intensity scale comparable to the felt Mercalli scale. Seismologists all across the world use these values to construct ShakeMaps.

Notable earthquakes

See also
Arias intensity
Long period ground motion
Peak ground acceleration

References 

Sources

 
 

Seismology